Sir Shankar Balasubramanian  (born 30 September 1966) is an Indian-born British chemist and Herchel Smith Professor of Medicinal Chemistry in the Department of Chemistry at the University of Cambridge, Senior Group Leader at the Cancer Research UK Cambridge Institute and Fellow of Trinity College, Cambridge. He is recognised for his contributions in the field of nucleic acids. He is scientific founder of Solexa and Cambridge Epigenetix.

Education
Born in Madras (now Chennai) India in 1966, Shankar Balasubramanian moved to the UK with his parents in 1967. He grew up in a rural area just outside Runcorn, Cheshire, and attended Daresbury Primary School, then Appleton Hall High School (which has since amalgamated to form Bridgewater High School). He went on to study the Natural Sciences Tripos at Fitzwilliam College, Cambridge, where he did his undergraduate degree from 1985 to 1988 and continued with a PhD for research on the reaction mechanism of the enzyme chorismate synthase supervised by Chris Abell (1988–1991).

Career and research
Following his PhD, Balasubramanian travelled to the United States as a SERC/NATO Research Fellow and worked in the group of Stephen J. Benkovic at Pennsylvania State University (1991–1993). 

He began his independent academic career in 1994 at the University of Cambridge and has remained there ever since, first as College Lecturer, then University Lecturer (1998), University Reader in Chemical Biology (2003) and Professor of Chemical Biology (2007). He was most recently appointed Herchel Smith Professor of Medicinal Chemistry in 2008.

He currently directs research laboratories in the Department of Chemistry and also the Cancer Research UK (CRUK) Cambridge Institute at the Cambridge Biomedical Campus. His former doctoral students include Julian Huppert.

Balasubramanian works in the field of nucleic acids.  His citation on election to the Royal Society reads:  

More recently Balasubramanian has been inventing and applying new chemical methods to study epigenetic changes to DNA bases including single base resolution sequencing of 5-formylcytosine, 5-hydroxymethylcytosine and 5-methylcytosine.

Honours and awards
Honours and awards include:
 1998 Glaxo Wellcome Award for Innovative Organic Chemistry
 2002 Corday–Morgan Medal and Prize of the Royal Society of Chemistry
 2009 Royal Society Mullard Award
 2010 BBSRC Innovator of the Year
 2010 BBSRC Commercial Innovator of the Year
 2011 Elected a Fellow of the Academy of Medical Sciences (FMedSci)
 2012 Elected a Fellow of the Royal Society (FRS)
 2012 Elected a member of the European Molecular Biology Organization (EMBO)
 2013 Tetrahedron Prize
 2014 Biochemical Society Heatley Medal and Prize
 2015 Chemical Research Society of India Medal
 2017 Appointed Knight Bachelor in the 2017 New Year Honours for services to science and medicine.
 2018 Royal Medal
 2020 Millennium Technology Prize
 2022 Breakthrough Prize in Life Sciences

References 

1966 births
Living people
Scientists from Chennai
Fellows of Trinity College, Cambridge
Indian emigrants to the United Kingdom
Members of the European Molecular Biology Organization
Alumni of Fitzwilliam College, Cambridge
British biochemists
Fellows of the Royal Society
Members of the University of Cambridge Department of Chemistry
Knights Bachelor
Tamil biochemists